The Michigan Wolverines men's lacrosse team is the intercollegiate men's lacrosse program representing the University of Michigan. The school competes in the Big Ten Conference in Division I of the National Collegiate Athletic Association (NCAA). Prior to joining the NCAA, Michigan competed as a club-varsity program at the Division I level of the Men's Collegiate Lacrosse Association (MCLA) in the Central Collegiate Lacrosse Association (CCLA), where the Wolverines secured three MCLA national championships and won 11 consecutive conference titles. The team is coached by Kevin Conry.

History 
The Michigan men's lacrosse team is one of the oldest collegiate lacrosse programs in the Midwest, having been founded in 1940. The program competed a few years until being halted for World War II. It was restarted in 1965 and has been playing ever since.

In 2001, the Wolverines were elevated to club-varsity status, competing at the Division I level of the Men's Collegiate Lacrosse Association (MCLA) in the Central Collegiate Lacrosse Association (CCLA). In 2008, the team became the first MCLA team to complete a season undefeated, finishing 20–0 and winning their first national championship at Texas Stadium. The feat was repeated in 2009 with another 20–0 season and earned their second national championship with a 12–11 victory over Chapman University at Dick's Sporting Goods Park in Denver, Colorado. In 2010, they won their third MCLA national championship in a row, defeating Arizona State University 12–11 in Denver. In 2008, Michigan faceoff specialist Brekan Kohlitz became the first MCLA player ever selected in the Major League Lacrosse draft when he was taken in the 5th round by the Washington Bayhawks. Michigan attackman Kyle Jackson was drafted as the 7th overall pick in the National Lacrosse League by the Rochester Knighthawks in 2016.

The program was promoted to NCAA Division I status by the university for the 2012 season. The Wolverines played in the ECAC Lacrosse League as an affiliate member during the 2012 season and as a full member in 2013 and 2014. In 2015, the Big Ten added men's lacrosse as a conference sport and the Wolverines joined Ohio State, Maryland, Rutgers, Penn State, and affiliate Johns Hopkins for the conference's first season.

Coaching staff

Season Results
The following is a list of Michigan's results by season as an NCAA Division I program:

{| class="wikitable"

|- align="center"

†NCAA canceled 2020 collegiate activities due to the COVID-19 virus.

Club Results

National Championships
MCLA Division I:
2008, 2009, 2010

Conference Championships
CCLA Regular Season:
1999, 2000, 2001, 2002, 2003, 2004, 2005, 2006, 2007, 2008, 2009, 2010, 2011

CCLA Tournament:
1999, 2000, 2001, 2002, 2003, 2005, 2007, 2008, 2009, 2010, 2011

The following is a list of Michigan's results by season as a independent club program from 1940 to 1971, and as a member of the Central Collegiate Lacrosse League from 1972 to 2011, prior to becoming an NCAA Division I program:
{| class="wikitable"

|- align="center"

Alumni in the Premier Lacrosse League

References

External links
 

NCAA Division I men's lacrosse teams
Michigan Wolverines men's lacrosse
Lacrosse clubs established in 2012
2012 establishments in Michigan